James Dennis Carroll (August 1, 1949 – September 11, 2009) was an American author, poet, autobiographer, and punk musician. Carroll was best known for his 1978 autobiographical work The Basketball Diaries, which inspired a 1995 film of the same title that starred Leonardo DiCaprio as Carroll, and his 1980 song "People Who Died" with the Jim Carroll Band.

Early life
Carroll was born to a working-class family of Irish descent, and grew up in New York City's Lower East Side. When he was about 11 (in the sixth grade) his family moved north to Inwood in Upper Manhattan. He was taught by the LaSalle Christian Brothers. In fall 1963, he entered Rice High School in Harlem, but was soon awarded a scholarship to the elite Trinity School. He attended Trinity from 1964 to 1968.

Carroll was a basketball star in high school, but also developed an addiction to heroin. He financed his drug habit by engaging in prostitution in the vicinity of 53rd Street and Third Avenue in Manhattan. Carroll briefly attended Wagner College and Columbia University. He dated Patti Smith.

Career

Carroll identified Rainer Maria Rilke, Frank O'Hara, John Ashbery, James Schuyler, Allen Ginsberg, and William S. Burroughs as influences on his artistic career.

Writing
While still in high school, Carroll published his first collection of poems, Organic Trains. Already attracting the attention of the local literati, his work began appearing in the Poetry Project's magazine The World in 1967. Soon his work was being published in elite literary magazines like Paris Review in 1968, and Poetry the following year. In 1970, his second collection of poems, 4 Ups and 1 Down was published, and he started working for Andy Warhol. At first, he was writing film dialogue and inventing character names; later on, Carroll worked as the co-manager of Warhol's Theater. Carroll's first publication by a mainstream publisher (Grossman Publishers), the poetry collection Living at the Movies, was published in 1973.

In 1978, Carroll published The Basketball Diaries, an autobiographical book concerning his life as a teenager in New York City's hard drug culture. Diaries is an edited collection of the diaries he kept during his high school years; it details his sexual experiences, his high school basketball career, and his addiction to heroin.

In 1987, Carroll wrote a second memoir, Forced Entries: The Downtown Diaries 1971–1973, continuing his autobiography into his early adulthood in the New York City music and art scene as well as his struggle to kick his drug habit.

After working as a musician, Carroll returned to writing full-time in the mid-1980s and began to appear regularly on the spoken-word circuit.  Starting in 1991, Carroll performed readings from his then-in-progress first novel, The Petting Zoo.

In 1995, Canadian filmmaker John L'Ecuyer adapted "Curtis's Charm", a short story from Carroll's 1993 book Fear of Dreaming, into the film Curtis's Charm.

Music
In 1978, after he moved to California to get a fresh start since overcoming his heroin addiction, Carroll formed Amsterdam, a new wave/punk rock group, with encouragement from Patti Smith, with whom he once shared an apartment in New York City, along with Robert Mapplethorpe. The musicians were Steve Linsley (bass), Wayne Woods (drums - he had previously been in hard rock band, Estus), Brian Linsley and Terrell Winn (guitars). He performed a spoken word piece with the Patti Smith Group in San Diego when the support band dropped out at the last moment.

They changed their name to The Jim Carroll Band and were able to secure a recording contract with Atlantic Records with the support of the Rolling Stones’ Keith Richards. They released a single, "People Who Died", taken from their 1980 debut album Catholic Boy, originally intended to be released on Rolling Stones Records. The single would make it to No. 103 on the Bubbling Under Hot 100 chart. The album featured contributions from Allen Lanier and Bobby Keys. The first known use of "People Who Died" in film was in Steven Spielberg's 1982 film E.T. the Extra-Terrestrial opening the first scene with dialogue while the boys play Dungeons & Dragons. It was also used in the 1985 Kim Richards film Tuff Turf starring James Spader and Robert Downey Jr., which also featured a cameo appearance by the band. It was also used in 2004's Dawn of the Dead, and in the 2015 episode "eps1.9_zer0-day.avi" in Season 1 of Mr. Robot. It was featured in the 1995 film The Basketball Diaries (based on Carroll's autobiography), and was covered by John Cale on his Antártida soundtrack. The song also was covered by the super group Hollywood Vampires on their album Rise with vocals by Johnny Depp. The song's title was based on a poem by Ted Berrigan. Later albums were Dry Dreams (1982) and I Write Your Name (1983), both with contributions from Lenny Kaye and Paul Sanchez (guitar). Carroll also collaborated with musicians Lou Reed, Blue Öyster Cult, Boz Scaggs, Ray Manzarek of The Doors, Pearl Jam, Electric Light Orchestra and Rancid.

"People Who Died" was most recently used in the 2021 film The Suicide Squad, directed by James Gunn, and the end credits of the Season 4 The Marvelous Mrs. Maisel episode "Everything Is Bellmore", paying tribute to late cast member Brian Tarantina.

Personal life
Carroll became sober in the 1970s. After moving to California, he met Rosemary Klemfuss; the couple married in 1978. The marriage ended in divorce, but the two remained friends.

Death
Carroll died of a heart attack at his Manhattan home on September 11, 2009, at the age of 60. At the time of his death, he was in ill health due to pneumonia and hepatitis C. He was working at his desk when he died. His funeral mass was held at Our Lady of Pompeii Catholic Church on Carmine Street in Greenwich Village.

Books

Poetry
Organic Trains (1967)
4 Ups and 1 Down (Angel Hair Press; 1970)
Living at the Movies (Penguin Books; September 24, 1973)
The Book of Nods (Puffin; April 1, 1986)
Fear of Dreaming: The Selected Poems (Penguin Books; November 1, 1993)
Void of Course: Poems 1994–1997 (Penguin Books; October 1, 1998) 
8 Fragments for Kurt Cobain (1994)

Prose
The Basketball Diaries (memoir) (1978)
Forced Entries: The Downtown Diaries 1971–1973 (memoir) (1987)
The Petting Zoo (novel) (2010; published posthumously)

Discography

Albums
Catholic Boy (1980)
Live Dreams (1981) 
Dry Dreams (1982) 
I Write Your Name (1983) 
A World Without Gravity: Best of The Jim Carroll Band (1993) 
Pools of Mercury (1998)  (2012 Digital Download) 
Runaway EP (2000)

Spoken word
Praying Mantis (1991)  (2008 Digipak reissue) 
The Basketball Diaries (1994)
Pools of Mercury (1998)

Collaborations
Live at Max's Kansas City, The Velvet Underground (1972)
Club Ninja, Blue Öyster Cult (1985)
Mistrial, Lou Reed (1986)
Other Roads, Boz Scaggs (1988)
Between Thought and Expression: The Lou Reed Anthology, Lou Reed (1992)
...And Out Come the Wolves, Rancid (1995)
Catholic Boy, Pearl Jam (1995)
Feeling You Up, Truly (1997)
Yes I Ram, Jon Tiven Group (1999)

Compilations and soundtracks
The Dial-a-Poem Poets (1972) 
Disconnected (1974) 
The Nova Convention (1979), with a once-only Frank Zappa performance
One World Poetry (1981) 
Better an Old Demon than a New God (1984) 
Lou Reed at the Capitol Theatre (1984)
Tuff Turf soundtrack (1985) 
Release #8 - 1993 (1993) 
Back to the Streets: Celebrating the Music of Don Covay (1993)
Sedated in the Eighties (1993)
New Wave Dance Hits: Just Can't Get Enough, Vol. 6 (1994)
The Basketball Diaries (soundtrack) (1995)
Put Your Tongue to the Rail: The Philly Comp for Catholic Children (Songs of the Jim Carroll Band) (1999)
WBCN Naked 2000 (1999) 
Dawn of the Dead (2004)
The Darwin Awards (2005)

See also
The Basketball Diaries
James Parks Morton Interfaith Award

References

External links

CatholicBoy.com
AP Obituary in The New York Times

1949 births
2009 deaths
20th-century American male singers
20th-century American male writers
20th-century American non-fiction writers
20th-century American novelists
20th-century American poets
20th-century American singers
20th-century diarists
21st-century American male writers
21st-century American non-fiction writers
21st-century American novelists
21st-century American poets
American diarists
American male non-fiction writers
American male novelists
American male poets
American people of Irish descent
American punk rock singers
Atco Records artists
Columbia University alumni
Giant Records (Warner) artists
Novelists from New York (state)
People from Inwood, Manhattan
People from the Lower East Side
Punk people
Punk poets
Wagner College alumni
Writers from Manhattan